was a village located in Kitasaku District, Nagano Prefecture, Japan.

As of March 1, 2004, the town had an estimated population of 5,793 and a density of 224.97 persons per km². The total area was 25.75 km².

On April 1, 2004, Kitamimaki, along with the town of Tōbu (from Chiisagata District), was merged to create the city of Tōmi.

External links
Tōmi official website 

Dissolved municipalities of Nagano Prefecture
Tōmi, Nagano

Map.Kitamimaki-Vill.PNG